Bradley Cantrell (born 1975) is a landscape architect and academic researching computation in landscape architecture.

Biography 
Bradley Cantrell received his undergraduate education from the University of Kentucky and a Masters in Landscape Architecture from the Harvard Graduate School of Design, where he focused on media and responsive technologies. After completing his studies at Harvard he worked professionally and maintained academic appointments at the Harvard Graduate School of Design, Rhode Island School of Design, Louisiana State University. During his time at Louisiana State University he developed courses in digital media and design studios that tested how responsive technologies and robotics might help shape future large scale infrastructure. This work was primarily situated in the Mississippi River Delta and addressed issues of land and habitat loss. His current work at the Harvard Graduate School of Design advances this research and continues to develop new methods of real time sensing, response, and autonomous infrastructures.

Cantrell's contribution to landscape architecture education is significant, after being granted tenure in 2012 at Louisiana State University he has held significant administrative appointments as graduate program director at the Harvard Graduate School of Design and currently is the acting Chair of Landscape Architecture at the University of Virginia School of Architecture. 
His approach to the discipline attempts to develop an education that merges socio-cultural and techno-centric approaches to territorial and planetary scale landscape issues. The curriculum and faculty in the UVA Department of Landscape Architecture clearly represents this vision and have created a cohort of researchers and educators that are focusing on issues of social and environmental justice, changing climate, and technological innovation via applied projects and theoretical approaches.

Honors and awards 
In 2012 he received the American Society of Landscape Architects award of excellence in communication for his book Digital Drawing for Landscape Architecture, co authored with Kenneth Wes Michaels. He was bestowed with the Rome Prize in Landscape Architecture in 2013 from the American Academy in Rome. In 2014, he was named a TED Global Fellow.

Publications 
 Digital Drawing for Landscape Architecture, Bradley Cantrell and Wes Michaels (Wiley, 2010)
 Modeling the Environment, Bradley Cantrell and Natalie Yates (Wiley, 2012)
 Responsive Landscapes, Bradley Cantrell and Justine Holzman (Routledge, 2015)
 Codify, Bradley Cantrell and Adam Mekies (Routledge, 2018)

References

American landscape architects
1975 births
Living people
Harvard Graduate School of Design alumni
University of Kentucky alumni